The Definitive Collection is a compilation album by Santana.

Track listing

Disc 1
"Jingo"
"Evil Ways"
"Soul Sacrifice"
"Black Magic Woman/Gypsy Queen"
"Oye Como Va"
"Samba Pa Ti"
"Everybody's Everything"
"Song of the Wind"
"Let the Children Play"
"Europa (Earth's Cry Heaven's Smile)"
"She's Not There"
"I'll Be Waiting"
"Well...All Right"
"Hold On"
"They All Went to Mexico"
"Say It Again"

Disc 2
"Hope You're Feeling Better"
"No One to Depend On"
"Stone Flower"
"One Chain (Don't Make No Prison)"
"Winning"
"Nowhere to Run"

1992 compilation albums
Santana (band) compilation albums